Brain Failure (脑浊; pinyin: Nǎozhuó) (1997–present) is a Chinese punk rock band based in Beijing, China. The band's songs are performed in Mandarin and English.

Members
Xiao Rong (肖容) - Vocals, Electric guitar
Wang Jian - Vocal, Electric guitar, Chorus
Gao Yufeng - Electric bass guitar
Xu Lin - Drums

Discography
Local Life (single) (demo version)  (2013; released online only)
Give You A Gift (single)  (2013; released online only)
Dare to be Tous Les Jours (album)  (2012; released in China only)
Nous Avons De La Chance (EP)  (2011; released online only)
Downtown Production (album)  (2009; released in China only)
A Box in The Broken Ball (EP)  (2008)
Coming Down to Beijing (album), 2007 a reselected issue of Turn on the Distortion released in China)
Beijing to Boston (Split with Big D And The Kids Table, 2006)
American Dreamer  (2005)
That's What I Know - track 11 (Compilation Give'em the Boot by Hell-Cat records world wild under Epitaph)  (2004)
Turn On The Distortion (2002)  Remastered by Mel "Herbie" Kent
Wuliao Contingent (Split album)  (1999)

References

External links
 BF's Unupdated web page
Brain Failure official site (Chinese)

See also
Chinese rock

Musical groups established in 1997
Chinese punk rock groups
Musical groups from Beijing